Come Back, All Is Forgiven (German: Kehre zurück! Alles vergeben!) is a 1929 German silent film directed by Erich Schönfelder and starring Dina Gralla,  Rudolf Biebrach and Emmy Wyda.

The film's sets were designed by the art directors Wilhelm Depenau and Heinrich Richter.

Cast
 Dina Gralla as Gina Tieck  
 Rudolf Biebrach as Kommerzienrat Tieck, ihr Vater  
 Emmy Wyda as Tante Hoopje aus Holland  
 Teddy Bill as Teddy, ihr Sohn  
 Robin Irvine as Rolf Irwisch  
 Albert Paulig as Ham, 1. Ganove  
 Siegfried Berisch as Eggs, 2. Ganove  
 Anna Müller-Lincke as Frau Falkenhorst  
 Else Reval as Katherina Sinnlich  
 Hugo Werner-Kahle as Der Schaubudenbesitzer  
 Wolfgang von Schwindt as Der Mann mit der Maulsperre  
 Heinrich Gotho

References

Bibliography
 Bock, Hans-Michael & Bergfelder, Tim. The Concise Cinegraph: Encyclopaedia of German Cinema. Berghahn Books, 2009.

External links

1929 films
Films of the Weimar Republic
German silent feature films
Films directed by Erich Schönfelder
German black-and-white films